Greg Minikin (born ) is an English professional rugby league footballer who plays as a er or  for Warrington Wolves in the Super League and the England Knights at international level.

He has previously played for the York City Knights in the Championship and the Castleford Tigers (Heritage № 966) in the Super League. Minkin also spent time on loan from Castleford at the Batley Bulldogs in the Kingstone Press Championship.

Background
Minikin was born in Knaresborough, North Yorkshire, England.

Career

York City Knights
Minikin made his Knights début on 12 May 2013 in a Challenge Cup match away at Catalans Dragons in the south of France. His league début came on 23 June 2013 in a Championship match against Leigh Centurions at the Leigh Sports Village.

Castleford Tigers
After an impressive three seasons at York, Minikin was signed by Super League club Castleford Tigers on a two-year contract starting in 2016.

He played in the 2017 Super League Grand Final defeat by the Leeds Rhinos at Old Trafford.

Batley Bulldogs (loan)
In that same year, Minikin was loaned to Championship side Batley. Here, he scored 4 tries in just 7 appearances.

Hull Kingston Rovers
In 2020, he joined Hull KR.  Minikin made a total of 10 appearances in the 2020 Super League season and scored six tries.  He missed most of the season with a knee injury which occurred against Wigan.

Warrington Wolves
On 6 September 2021, it was reported that he had signed for Warrington in the Super League

International career
In July 2018 he was selected in the England Knights Performance squad.

In 2019 he was selected for the England Knights against Jamaica at Headingley Rugby Stadium.

References

External links

Castleford Tigers profile
SL profile

1995 births
Living people
People from Knaresborough
Batley Bulldogs players
Castleford Tigers players
English rugby league players
Hull Kingston Rovers players
Rugby league centres
Rugby league players from Yorkshire
Rugby league wingers
Warrington Wolves players
York City Knights players